Gregg is an unincorporated community in Newton County, in the U.S. state of Missouri.

History
A post office called Gregg was established in 1892, and remained in operation until 1906. The community has the name of one Mr. Gregg, a local prospector.

References

Unincorporated communities in Newton County, Missouri
Unincorporated communities in Missouri